Dabir Khan was a 20th-century 'beenkar' and a vocalist. He was the grandson of legendary vina player Wazir Khan.

Career
Dabir Khan learned veena from his grandfather, Wazir Khan. He was employed at All India Radio Calcutta. Dabir Khan is also considered as one of India's legendary musician Miyan Tansen's last descendants and in 1969 was awarded a Sangeet Natak Akademi Award. Among the pupils of Dabir Khan was K.C. Dey, Pandit Santosh Banerjee (Formerly head of department of instrumental music, Rabindra Bharati University, Calcutta), Asit De (Head of the Theory Division of the Saha Institute of Nuclear Physics, Kolkata) and the noted singer Manna Dey.

Personal life
Dabir Khan was born in Rampur State in 1905. He died in 1972.

Awards and recognition
Sangeet Natak Akademi Award by the Government of India in 1969

See also
Hindustani classical music
Sadarang
Tansen
Clem Alford was a student of Pandit S.N. Saha, who was himself a student of Ustad Md. Dabir Khan. Md. Dabir Khan was the external examiner of Clem Alford in 1969 at Midnapore Music College.

References

Indian male singers
Indian Shia Muslims
Hindustani instrumentalists
All India Radio people
1972 deaths
Veena players
Recipients of the Sangeet Natak Akademi Award